Cedarcrest High School is a four-year public secondary school located in Duvall, Washington. It opened its doors in 1993, and is the only traditional high school in Riverview School District #407.

The boundary of its school district includes Carnation, Duvall, Lake Marcel-Stillwater, and portions of Ames Lake, Cottage Lake, and Union Hill-Novelty Hill.

Athletics
Cedarcrest competes in athletics in WIAA Class 2A in the WESCO Conference.

The Cedarcrest baseball team (2A) and drill team (3A) won state titles in 2009.

History
Cedarcrest High School opened in 1993, replacing Tolt High School as the high school in the Riverview School District, with the old campus becoming Tolt Middle School.

References

External links

Riverview School District #407

High schools in King County, Washington
Educational institutions established in 1993
Public high schools in Washington (state)
1993 establishments in Washington (state)